Dalipadu is a village in Y. Ramavaram Mandal, East Godavari district in the state of Andhra Pradesh in India.

Demographics 
 India census, This Village had a population of 492, out of which 200 were male and 292 were female. Population of children below 6 years of age were 10%. The literacy rate of the village is 49%.

References 

Villages in Y. Ramavaram mandal